This is a list of the tallest structures in Italy. This list contains all types of structures.

See also 
 List of tallest buildings in Italy

External links 
 * Diagrams - SkysraperPage.com

Sources 
Enav, Ente Nazionale Assistenza al Volo - Italian ATC

Tallest structures in Italy, List of
Italy
Tallest structures